Joods Actueel (Jewish Current) is a Belgian monthly newspaper, owned and operated by the Freilich family and published in Dutch. It informs readers of news related to Jewish life in Flanders, Belgium, and elsewhere in the world. Joods Actueel was founded in January 2007 as successor to the Belgisch-Israëlitisch Weekblad (Belgian-Israeli Weekly). The newspaper is run by Michael Freilich and his mother Terry Davids.

The journal has a clear opinion on the Arab-Israeli conflict and does not hesitate to go in the offensive. In 2008 it confronted several Belgian stand-up comics and television producers for "trivialising" Adolf Hitler in a cooking show featuring his favorite dish.  Its editor Guido Joris has been accused by some of using hate speech against public figures and media with an opposing view on the conflict.

References

External links 
  

Dutch-language newspapers published in Belgium
Dutch-language newspapers
Jews and Judaism in Belgium
Zionism in Belgium